Silver chlorate (AgClO3) forms white, tetragonal crystals.  Like all chlorates, it is water-soluble and an oxidizing agent. As a simple metal salt, it is a common chemical in basic inorganic chemistry experiments. It is light-sensitive, so it must be stored in tightly closed dark-coloured containers.

The substance exhibits blasting properties, therefore it is sometimes used as a primary explosive.

Silver(I) means silver is in its normal +1 oxidation state.

Production
Silver chlorate is produced by the reaction of silver nitrate with sodium chlorate to produce both silver chlorate and sodium nitrate.

Alternatively, it may be produced by the transmission of chlorine through a suspension of silver oxide.

See also

Silver chloride
Silver(I) fluoride
Silver(II) fluoride
Silver(I) nitrate

References

Chlorates
Silver compounds
Oxidizing agents